{ "type": "ExternalData", "service": "geoshape", "ids": "Q5501480" }

Fremantle Fishing Boat Harbour is a marina in Fremantle, Western Australia adjacent to the more recently constructed Challenger Harbour.  It provides large sheltered mooring areas and wharf space for vessels up to 60 metres, refuelling facilities and support services to the Fremantle fishing industry.

History

The harbour was built in 1919 when a 300-metre breakwater was constructed from Anglesea Point at the southern end of Bathers Beach, to provide an anchorage for fishing vessels. South Jetty was immediately adjacent and included a fish market, which was removed in 1929.  

A southern breakwater was constructed in 1962 and land reclaimed to house fishing companies and service industries. Between 1969 and 1972, up to 120 fishing boats were housed in the harbour and in 1982 construction of a boat lifting facility commenced.

Tourism
Fremantle Fishing Boat Harbour is now surrounded by a well established tourism precinct and over a dozen restaurants and a brewery (Little Creatures) are immediately adjacent.

Blessing of the Fleet
Many of the fishing enterprises housed at Fremantle are descended from the Italian towns of Molfetta on the Adriatic Sea, and  Capo d'Orlando in Sicily.  Each year, a ceremony known as the Blessing of the Fleet occurs in the harbour where a procession of the fishermen and their families walk through the streets of Fremantle to the harbour carrying two statues.

References

Marinas in Australia
Fremantle
Fishing in Australia